Whitewater is a city located in Walworth and Jefferson counties in the U.S. state of Wisconsin. Located near the southern portion of the Kettle Moraine State Forest, Whitewater is the home of the University of Wisconsin–Whitewater. As of the 2020 census, the city's population was 14,889.

History
Whitewater was founded at the confluence of Whitewater Creek and Spring Brook, and named for the white sand in their beds. A gristmill was built on Whitewater creek, the resulting pond now called Cravath Lake. The town grew quickly when the first railroad line in Wisconsin passed through in 1853, but struggled when the two largest employers left town.

Whitewater was originally founded entirely by settlers who arrived there from New England. These people were "Yankees", that is to say they were descended from the English Puritans who settled New England in the 1600s. They were part of a wave of New England farmers who headed west into what was then the wilds of the Northwest Territory during the early 1800s. Most of them arrived as a result of the completion of the Erie Canal. When they arrived in what is now Whitewater, then nothing but dense virgin forest and wild prairie, the New Englanders laid out farms, constructed roads, erected government buildings and established post routes. They brought with them many of their Yankee New England values, such as staunch support for abolitionism and a passion for education, establishing many schools as well. They were mostly members of the Congregationalist Church though some were Episcopalian. Due to the second Great Awakening some of them had converted to Methodism before moving to what is now Whitewater. Whitewater, like much of Wisconsin, would be culturally very continuous with early New England culture for most of its early history. 

Unlike much of Wisconsin, Walworth County was notable for not being heavily German-American, Whitewater had almost no German-Americans at a time when the state as a whole was receiving many. Whitewater in particular and Walworth County in general were also heavily anti-slavery, and the abolitionist movement was popular amongst the New England descended portion of the population in the area.

In the late 1800s immigrant families primarily from Belgium, Canada, Russia and Serbia settled in Whitewater, as well as smaller amounts of immigrants from France and England.

Geography
Most of the city lies in Walworth County.

Demographics

2020 census 
As of the census of 2020, there were 14,889 people, 4,767 households, and 1,806 families living in the city. The racial makeup of the city was 78.8% White, 4.2% African American, 0.5% Native American, 2.5% Asian, 0.04% Pacific Islander, 7.2% from other races, and 6.4% from two or more races. 

There were 4,767 households, of which 19.9% had one or more people under the age of 18 living with them, and 25.5% had one or more people 60 years or older living in them, with 9.9% having someone living alone who was 65 years or older. The average household size was 2.32 and the average family size was 3.01.

The median age in the city was 21.6 years. 10.6% of residents were under the age of 18; 57.3% were between the ages of 18 and 24; 71.5% were 15 to 44 years old. The gender makeup of the city was 50.9% male and 49.1% female.

2010 census
As of the census of 2010, there were 14,390 people, 4,766 households, and 1,781 families living in the city. The racial makeup of the city was 88.0% White, 3.5% African American, 0.3% Native American, 1.9% Asian, 0.1% Pacific Islander, 4.5% from other races, and 1.8% from two or more races. Hispanic or Latino of any race were 9.5% of the population.

There were 4,766 households, of which 18.8% had children under the age of 18 living with them, 26.2% were married couples living together, 7.4% had a female householder with no husband present, 3.8% had a male householder with no wife present, and 62.6% were non-families. 34.6% of all households were made up of individuals, and 9.7% had someone living alone who was 65 years of age or older. The average household size was 2.28 and the average family size was 3.01.

The median age in the city was 21.9 years. 11.9% of residents were under the age of 18; 53.5% were between the ages of 18 and 24; 14.7% were from 25 to 44; 11.8% were from 45 to 64; and 8.4% were 65 years of age or older. The gender makeup of the city was 50.7% male and 49.3% female.

2000 census
As of the census of 2000, there were 13,437 people, 4,132 households, and 1,685 families living in the city. The population density was 1,923.5 people per square mile (742.2/km2). There were 4,340 housing units at an average density of 621.3 per square mile (239.7/km2). The racial makeup of the city was 92.25% White, 2.34% African American, 0.27% Native American, 1.47% Asian, 0.01% Pacific Islander, 2.48% from other races, and 1.18% from two or more races. Hispanic or Latino of any race were 6.50% of the population.

There were 4,132 households, out of which 19.3% had children under the age of 18 living with them, 30.5% were married couples living together, 7.1% had a female householder with no husband present, and 59.2% were non-families. 32.7% of all households were made up of individuals, and 10.7% had someone living alone who was 65 years of age or older. The average household size was 2.38 and the average family size was 3.00.

In the city, the population was spread out, with 12.5% under the age of 18, 53.2% from 18 to 24, 15.7% from 25 to 44, 9.8% from 45 to 64, and 8.9% who were 65 years of age or older. The median age was 22 years. For every 100 females, there were 95.6 males. For every 100 females age 18 and over, there were 94.1 males.

The median income for a household in the city was $31,600, and the median income for a family was $48,185. Males had a median income of $33,078 versus $22,431 for females. The per capita income for the city was $13,965. About 10.6% of families and 27.4% of the population were below the poverty line, including 17.3% of those under age 18 and 4.2% of those age 65 or over. (Note: information in this paragraph is still from the 2000 census.)

Arts and culture

Annual events in Whitewater include "Freeze Fest" in January, the Bridal Fair, Farm Toy Show in February, Maxwell Street Day and the 4th of July Celebration in July. The Minneiska Water Ski Shows perform in the summer on Whitewater Lake. Departing from the Highway 12 crossing of the Ice Age Trail, group biking tours depart several times a week from the area. September through April, Young Auditorium at the university hosts entertainment.

Places of worship
 Anchor Bible Church
 Community of St. Patrick Catholic Church
 Congregational United Church of Christ
 First English Lutheran Church
 First United Methodist Church
 Kettle Moraine Baptist Church
 Living Word Fellowship
 Whitewater Bible Church
 Whitewater Family Church
 Whitewater Islamic center
Crosspointe Community Church
Hope Ministries

Parks and recreation
There are five community parks in Whitewater: Cravath Lakefront Park, Moraine View Park, Starin Park, Trippe Lake Park, and Whitewater Creek Nature Area. Effigy Mounds Preserve is an archeological park. An aquatic and fitness center is located in Whitewater.

Government

Whitewater has a council-manager form of government. The city manager is Cameron Clapper and the municipal judge is Patrick Taylor. The Whitewater Common Council is made up of one member from each of the five districts and two members-at-large. The Common Council meets on the first and third Tuesdays of the month at City Hall, with its meetings being broadcast live on Whitewater Public Television.

Education 
Whitewater is served by the Whitewater Unified School District (WWUSD), which has five schools and one university in the city:
 Lakeview Elementary School
 Lincoln Elementary School
 Washington Elementary School
 Whitewater Middle School (WMS)
 Whitewater High School (WHS)
 University of Wisconsin–Whitewater

Kettle Moraine Baptist Academy, which serves students in grades kindergarten through 12, is also located in the city.

Notable people 

 Stephen Ambrose, author, historian
 George Awsumb, architect
 James C. Bartholf, Wisconsin politician and newspaper editor
 Zadoc P. Beach, Wisconsin politician
 Tom Bigelow, auto racer
 Marvin H. Bovee, Wisconsin politician
 Edwin Coe, newspaper editor and politician
 Charles Coleman, Wisconsin politician
 Edward S. Curtis, photographer, director, actor, cinematographer
 Frank A. Dudley, New York state legislator and lawyer
 Jeffrey Foucault, recording artist
 Eva Kinney Griffith, journalist, temperance activist
 Ben Heller, Major League baseball player
 George W. Hull, Wisconsin politician
 Jeff Jagodzinski, NFL assistant coach, former head coach of the Boston College Eagles
 Dale Markham, NFL player
 Benjamin McCready, painter
 Stephen Nass, Wisconsin politician
 Leon Pescheret, fine artist, designer, printmaker
 Elaine Roe, U.S. Army officer, one of the first four women to be awarded the Silver Star
 Edward J. Roethe, Wisconsin legislator
 Henry Edgar Roethe, Wisconsin legislator
 Byron Storm, Wisconsin legislator
 Eric Studesville, NFL assistant coach
 Eleazer Wakeley, Justice of the Nebraska Territory Supreme Court
 Jerome Anthony Watrous (1840–1922), was an American author, newspaper writer, Republican politician, and a Lt. Colonel as a US soldier
 Thompson Weeks, Wisconsin politician
 Samuel A. White, Wisconsin politician

References

Further reading
 Kraege, Fred G. Whitewater. Charleston, SC: Arcadia Press, 2006.

External links

 City of Whitewater

 
Cities in Wisconsin
Cities in Jefferson County, Wisconsin
Cities in Walworth County, Wisconsin